Cyphoscyla is a genus of beetle in the family Cerambycidae. Its only species is Cyphoscyla lacordairei. It was described by Thomson in 1868.

References

Pteropliini
Beetles described in 1868